Project G.e.e.K.e.R. is an animated television series that premiered on CBS on September 14, 1996. It was created by Douglas TenNapel, creator of Earthworm Jim, and Doug Langdale, the developer of Earthworm Jim the animated series, and was a production of Columbia TriStar Television under Adelaide Productions, with original music by Shawn Patterson (main title theme by Terry Scott Taylor). TenNapel and Taylor also collaborated on the video games The Neverhood, Boombots and Skullmonkeys, and in 2005, re-united for the Nickelodeon cartoon Catscratch.

The show was cancelled after only one season, as CBS cancelled all of their Saturday morning schedule in 1997 to stop their downward-spiraling ratings.

The Federal Communications Commission also rejected CBS's attempt to classify the show as educational and informational under that fall's strengthened requirements for children's programming.

Synopsis
The show parodied the style of action-adventure cartoons. Set in the future, it was based around a genetic shapeshifter experiment known as Project GKR (Geno-Kinetic Research), who had been stolen by Lady MacBeth (a short-tempered cyborg with a bionic arm) before the creator could finish programming. He needed to be a deadly and powerful weapon at the hands of the evil Mister Moloch, head of Moloch Industries, but due to the lack of his final programming, "GeeKeR" is left to be a totally random, permanently salivating, four-fingered klutz. He only occasionally manages to use his powers to any full extent, a blessing and a threat to his friends and their enemies. Lady MacBeth (whom GeeKeR calls Becky) and her partner-in-crime Noah, a baseball cap-wearing intelligent Tyrannosaurus rex, must now prevent Moloch and GeeKeR's creator Dr. Maston from ever obtaining GeeKeR at all costs.

Cast 
 Billy West as G.e.e.K.e.R., Additional Voices
 Cree Summer as Lady MacBeth, Nanny, Sonny, Additional Voices
 Charles Adler as Dr. Maston, Jake Dragonn, Gene Damage, Additional Voices
 Jim Cummings as Mister Moloch, Will Dragonn, Cosmotto, Additional Voices
 Brad Garrett as Noah, Captain Wormhole

Additional voices
 Danny Mann as Redjack
 Ed Gilbert as Dinosaur Leader
 Jeff Bennett as Larry the Virus
 Charity James
 Kath Soucie
 Dee Dee Rescher as Female Junker
 Joe Alaskey
 Jason Marsden as Kid Dinosaur
 Kevin Michael Richardson as Stonebender/"Mr. Smiley", Additional Voices
 Joe Lala
 Michael Bell as Toxic Moose
 Lisa Kaplan

Episodes

Credits 
 Executive Producers: Douglas TenNapel and Douglas Langdale
 Supervising Producer: Richard Raynis
 Producer: Audu Paden
 Associate Producers: Monique Beatty and Greg Chalekian
 Production Coordinator: Luke Wasserman
 Original Music: Shawn Patterson
 Theme Song: Terry Scott Taylor
 Color Designer: Don W. Kim
 Music Editor: Bradford Cox
 Dialogue Editor: Thomas Kearney
 Digital Compositor (Opening Titles): Andy Jolliff
 Background Designers: Vince Toyama and David James
 Storyboard Revisor: Charles Garcia

Music 
Terry Scott Taylor (friend of creator Doug TenNapel) was contracted to write the main title theme for the show, while Shawn Patterson was selected to be the series score composer. Two days before the show was set to air, Columbia TriStar discovered a licensing issue with Terry and Patterson was asked by the producers to compose and produce a main title theme to go on the air. Shawn completed this and Project GeeKeR aired with Shawn's original main title music. Weeks into the series, the licensing problem with Terry Scott Taylor was cleared up and the show's creator Doug TenNapel requested that Terry's original main title theme be reinserted into the series. Patterson's main title music was then removed from the remainder of the series.

See also 
Earthworm Jim
The Weekenders
Dave the Barbarian
Catscratch
Doug TenNapel
Doug Langdale
Sony Pictures Entertainment

References

External links
 at Sony
 at CBS

Project Geeker on Retrojunk

CBS original programming
1990s American animated television series
1990s American comic science fiction television series
1996 American television series debuts
1996 American television series endings
American children's animated action television series
American children's animated adventure television series
American children's animated comic science fiction television series
English-language television shows
Television series by Sony Pictures Television
Television series created by Doug TenNapel
Television series created by Doug Langdale
Television series by Adelaide Productions